Aliya Nurgayanovna (Nikolayevna) Garaeva (Garayeva), born 1 January 1988 in Yekaterinburg, Russian SFSR, Soviet Union) is a retired Azerbaijani individual rhythmic gymnast. She represented Russia (until 2005), and Azerbaijan (2006-2012). She is the 2011 World All-around bronze medalist, a two-time (2010, 2012) European All-around bronze medalist, two time (2007, 2011) Grand Prix Final All-around bronze medalist and five-time Azerbaijanii National champion. She was one of very few gymnasts not representing Russia to ever been trained by Irina Viner, famous head coach of Russia's national team.

Career 
Garayeva became a two-time Azerbaijan champion in 2006 for her individual performances. She won bronze at the 2007 Grand Prix in Moscow in the all-around competition and two individual performances. Garayeva placed 6th in the all-around competition at the European Championships held in Moscow in 2006. She placed first in the ribbon and became the all-around bronze medalist. Garayeva finished third at international tournaments held in Russia, Greece and Italy.

In 2006, Garayeva finished 4th at a club world championship held in Japan. In February 2007, her team won a stage of the Italian club championship. Competing in her first Olympics at the 2008 Summer Olympics in Beijing, China, Garayeva finished 6th in the event all-around finals.

Garayeva won bronze at the 2010 World Championships in the individual apparatus finals in ball, ribbon and hoop. She also won the all-around bronze medal at the 2010 European Championships. The following year, Garayeva won the all-around bronze medal at the 2011 World Championships in Montpellier, France. She then competed at the Grand Prix Final and won bronze in all-around, as well as bronze in hoop, ball, clubs and ribbon finals.

Garayeva started the 2012 season by winning bronze medal in the all-around at the Penza World Cup and the silver medal at the World Cup in Tashkent. She then won her second European all-around bronze medal at 2012 European Championships. At the 2012 Summer Olympics in London, Garayeva was 3rd in the qualifications. She finished 4th in the all-around finals with Belarus' Liubov Charkashyna taking the bronze medal. She completed her competitive career at the end of the 2012 Season.

Following the 2012 Olympics, Garayeva announced retiring from gymnastics. Garayeva married in 2012 and in 2014 began a career as a coach in rhythmic gymnastics.

Personal life 
Garayeva was born in a Tatar family. Her mother, Vasilina Akhatovna Garaeva, is a rhythmic gymnastic coach. She is married to Azerbaijani Javid Hajiyev, and on 7 August 2015 she gave birth to their first child, a son named Timur. The couple welcomed their second child, a son named Emil, on the 13th of October 2018. They currently reside in Frankfurt, Germany.

Detailed Olympic results

References

External links
 
 
 
 
 Aliya Garaeva with her mother
 Aliya Garaeva in childhood
 Aliya Garaeva on Instagram
 Aliya Garaeva on Vkontakte

1988 births
Living people
Volga Tatar people
Tatar people of Russia
Tatar sportspeople
Sportspeople from Baku
Sportspeople from Yekaterinburg
Azerbaijani rhythmic gymnasts
Gymnasts at the 2008 Summer Olympics
Gymnasts at the 2012 Summer Olympics
Olympic gymnasts of Azerbaijan
Azerbaijani people of Tatar descent
Medalists at the Rhythmic Gymnastics European Championships
Medalists at the Rhythmic Gymnastics World Championships
World Games bronze medalists
Competitors at the 2009 World Games
Universiade medalists in gymnastics
Universiade silver medalists for Azerbaijan
Medalists at the 2011 Summer Universiade